The Journal for the Education of the Gifted  is a quarterly peer-reviewed academic journal that covers the field of education. The journal's editors-in-chief are Jennifer L. Jolly and Jennifer H. Robins. It was established in 1978 and is currently published by SAGE Publications. The journal covers research on the educational and psychological needs of gifted and talented children.

Abstracting and indexing 
The Journal for the Education of the Gifted is abstracted and indexed in:
 Arts and Humanities Search
 EBSCO
 Educational Research Abstracts Online
 ERIC
 PsycINFO
 Scopus

External links 
 

Special education journals
Quarterly journals
English-language journals
Publications established in 1978
SAGE Publishing academic journals